is a railway station in Toshima, Tokyo, Japan, operated by East Japan Railway Company (JR East).

Lines
Ōtsuka Station is served by the circular Yamanote Line. A stop on the Tokyo Sakura Tram, named Ōtsuka-ekimae Station is located underneath Ōtsuka Station.

Station layout
The station consists of an elevated island platform serving the two Yamanote Line tracks. The station has a Midori no Madoguchi staffed ticket office.

Chest-high platform edge doors were installed on the Yamanote Line platforms, brought into use from 20 April 2013.

Platforms

History

The station opened on 1 April 1903.

The wooden station structure on the south side was demolished in 2009.

Station numbering was introduced in 2016 with Ōtsuka being assigned station number JY12.

Passenger statistics
In fiscal 2010, the station was used by an average of 53,346 passengers daily (boarding passengers only).

Surrounding area

 Shin-ōtsuka Station (on the Tokyo Metro Marunouchi Line)
 Sugamo Police Station
 Sugamo Junior & Senior High School
 Minami-Ōtsuka Hall

See also

 List of railway stations in Japan

References

External links

 JR East station information 
 Toei station information 

Railway stations in Tokyo
Railway stations in Japan opened in 1903
Yamanote Line